Okazi soup is an Igbo soup similar to Afang soup of the Efik tribe; the difference between the two is that okazi is thicker than Afang aside the peculiarity to each tribe.
The soup is made majorly from two leaves: okazi and water leaf.

Some ingredients used in making the soup include palm oil, egusi balls (mgbam), crayfish and seasoning cubes. Okazi soup can be eaten with swallows such as eba, Semo and pounded yam.

See also 
Nigerian cuisine
Ubakala
Gnetum africanum
OnGACIOUS

References 

Nigerian soups